Peru competed at the 2022 World Games held in Birmingham, United States from 7 to 17 July 2022. Athletes representing Peru won one silver medal and the country finished in 63rd place in the medal table.

Medalists

Competitors
The following is the list of number of competitors in the Games.

Cue sports

Peru competed in cue sports.

Karate

Peru won one silver medal in karate.

Women

Muaythai

Peru competed in muaythai.

Squash

Peru competed in squash.

References

Nations at the 2022 World Games
2022
World Games